Lukáš Vartovník (born 8 March 1989) is a Slovak professional ice hockey centre currently playing for HK Spišská Nová Ves of the Slovak Extraliga.

Career
Vartovník began his career with HC Zlín, playing in their various Jr. teams in 2006. After that he played for Everett Silvertips of Western Hockey League.

Vartovník previously played for HC '05 Banská Bystrica, HK Brezno, MHC Martin, HC Prešov, MHk 32 Liptovský Mikuláš, MHK Humenné and HK Poprad.

Career statistics

Regular season and playoffs

References

External links

 

1989 births
Living people
Slovak ice hockey forwards
Slovak ice hockey centres
HC '05 Banská Bystrica players
MHk 32 Liptovský Mikuláš players
People from Gelnica
Sportspeople from the Košice Region
HK Spišská Nová Ves players
HK Poprad players
PSG Berani Zlín players
Everett Silvertips players
MHC Martin players
HC Prešov players
Slovak expatriate ice hockey players in the United States